Fort Street Public School (abbreviated as FSPS) is a government co-educational primary school located in Millers Point, a suburb of Sydney, New South Wales, Australia. Established in 1849, it is one of the oldest government schools in Australia, and is operated by the New South Wales Department of Education.

History 
Fort Street Public School descends from Fort Street Model School, established in 1849 and the first government model school in the colony of New South Wales; which also makes  it one of the oldest public schools in Australia.

The history of public education in Australia began when the Governor of New South Wales Charles FitzRoy established a Board of National Education on 8 January 1848 to implement a national system of education throughout the colony. The board decided to create two model schools, one for boys and one for girls. The site of Fort Street Model School was chosen as the old Military Hospital at Fort Phillip, on Sydney's Observatory Hill. This school was not only intended to educate boys and girls, but also to serve as a model for other schools in the colony. The school's name is derived from the name of a street which ran into the grounds of the hospital and became part of the playground during its reconstruction.

From the 1850s the Model School offered both primary and secondary education, and was associated with Fort Street Training School, which trained all public school teachers in the colony. The school became Fort Street Superior Public School in 1881.

In 1911, the school separated into a primary school, Fort Street Public School, and two high schools, Fort Street Boys' and Fort Street Girls'. The Public School has remained on Observatory Hill near the Model School's original building, which now houses the National Trust of Australia.

The secondary section's girls' school and boys' school moved at different times to Petersham, where they amalgamated to become Fort Street High School. There is now no direct relationship between the primary and secondary schools.

On 24 November 2016, Queen Rania of Jordan visited the school as part of a state visit with her husband, King Abdullah II of Jordan.

On Day 1 Term 4, 2020, the school relocated to temporary structures in Wentworth Park to facilitate an upgrade of the school site at Observatory Hill. The upgrade is expected to be completed in July 2023.

Enrolments 

In 2011 the school had an enrolment number of 86 students. The number of students grew significantly since then, as in 2014 the enrolment was 123 students. In 2018 the school reported an enrolment of 220 students.

School traditions

Student leadership 
At the end of each year, a Year 5 student is elected School Captain for the next year by the student body, and another as Vice Captain. At the beginning of each year, House Captains are elected by the student body.

Houses 
As with most Australian schools, FSPS utilizes a house system. Students are allocated to a house when they enter the school. There are four different houses which students compete under in sports Carnivals and other activities:
 Argyle (Red)
 Cumberland (Green)
 Kent (Blue)
 Watson (Yellow)
All of the houses are named after streets in The Rocks, Sydney.

Alumni 
Some early alumni (such as Edmund Barton) were educated at the school prior to its separation into a primary and two secondary schools, and are counted as alumni by both the Public School and the High School: see List of Fortians for these.

Some other notable Fort Street Public School alumni include:
Australian politicians
 Arthur Grimm
 Henry Hoyle
 James Shand
 John Daniel FitzGerald
 Patrick Quinn
 Richard McCoy

See also 

 List of Government schools in New South Wales: A–F

Notes

References

External links 

 Dymocks Book Bank, literacy support program in which FSPS participates
 
 Gallows Hill, in The Rocks history (accessed 2017-02-26)

Educational institutions established in 1849
Millers Point, New South Wales
Public primary schools in Sydney
1849 establishments in Australia